Jackie Barnett Presents Songs for Sunday is a 1967 album by Jimmy Durante, with arrangements by Ralph Carmichael. David Bakish, in his 1995 book on Durante, described the music on the album as "truly from the heart". Durante later performed "Peace in the Valley" and "One of These Days" at the Oral Roberts summer festival in June 1971.

Track listing
 "Down By the River Side" (Jackie Barnett, Jimmy Durante)
 "Precious Lord"
 "He Touched Me"
 "In the Garden"
 "Somebody's Keeping Score" (Barnett, Sammy Fain)
 "Amen" (Barnett, Durante)
 "Beyond the Sunset"
 "Peace In the Valley"
 "His Eye Is On the Sparrow"
 "One of These Days"

Personnel
Jimmy Durante – vocals
Ralph Carmichael – arranger, conductor
Ed Thrasher – art direction
Lowell Frank – engineer
Jackie Barnett – producer

References

External links
 

1967 albums
Albums arranged by Ralph Carmichael
Albums conducted by Ralph Carmichael
Albums produced by Jackie Barnett
Christian music albums by American artists
Jimmy Durante albums
Warner Records albums